The Russia–Korea Treaty of 1884 was negotiated between representatives of Russia and Korea.

Background
In 1876, Korea established a trade treaty with Japan after Japanese ships approached Ganghwado and threatened to fire on the Korean capital. Treaty negotiations with several Western countries were made possible by the completion of the initial Japanese overture.

In 1882, the Americans concluded a treaty and established diplomatic relations, which served as a template for subsequent negotiations with other Western powers.

Terms
The Russians and Koreans negotiated and approved a multi-article treaty with provisions similar to those of other Western nations.

Ministers from Russia to Korea were appointed in accordance with the treaty: Karl Ivanovich Weber, appointed October 14, 1885; Alexey Shpeyer, appointed March 28, 1898; Paul Pavlov, appointed December 13, 1898.

The treaty remained in effect even after a Japanese protectorate was established over Korea in 1905.

See also
 Unequal treaties
 List of Ambassadors from Russia to North Korea
 List of Ambassadors from Russia to South Korea

Notes

References
 Kim, Chun-gil. (2005). The History of Korea. Westport, Connecticut: Greenwood Press. ; ;  OCLC 217866287
 Korean Mission to the Conference on the Limitation of Armament, Washington, D.C., 1921-1922. (1922). Korea's Appeal to the Conference on Limitation of Armament. Washington: U.S. Government Printing Office. OCLC 12923609
 Warner, Denis Ashton and Peggy Warner. (1974). The Tide at Sunrise: a History of the Russo-Japanese War, 1904-1905. New York: Charterhouse. OCLC 422325975
 Yŏng-ho Ch'oe; William Theodore De Bary; Martina Deuchler and Peter Hacksoo Lee. (2000). Sources of Korean Tradition: From the Sixteenth to the Twentieth Centuries. New York: Columbia University Press. ; ;  OCLC 248562016

Unequal treaties
Treaties of the Russian Empire
Treaties of the Joseon dynasty
Treaties of the Korean Empire
Treaties concluded in 1884
1884 in Korea
1884 in the Russian Empire
Bilateral treaties of Russia